Siranush Yakovlevna Atoyan (1904–1985) was a Soviet Armenian architect.

Biography 
Atoyan attended National Polytechnic University of Armenia (formerly Yerevan Polytechnic Institute), and graduated in 1931. 

Starting in 1932, she was a member of the Armenian Union of Architects.

Works 
 Dwelling houses in the workers' settlements, Dzoraget, Lori Province
 House of the paramilitary guards of Dzoraget
 Kanaker Hydroelectric Power Station, part of Sevan–Hrazdan Cascade, Kanaker, Kanaker-Zeytun, Yerevan, Armenia
 Dwelling houses in the workers' settlements, Kanaker-Zeytun District, Yerevan
 Kanaker GES club in Yerevan
 Arzni mineral water plant, Arzni, Kotayk Province, Armenia
 Kindergarten-nursery, Arzni mineral water plant
 Repair and mechanical workshop, Arzni mineral water plant
 Sugar sale warehouses in Yerevan
 "Pišchevik" company stadium in Yerevan

See also 
 Armenian architecture

References 

1904 births
1985 deaths
Armenian architects
People from Yerevan
National Polytechnic University of Armenia alumni
Soviet architects
Russian people of Armenian descent
Women architects